Harold Warren Danforth (8 April 1916 – 7 May 1993) was a Progressive Conservative party member of the House of Commons of Canada. Born in Leamington, Ontario, he was a farmer by career.

Danforth attended Ontario Agricultural College after which he farmed in the Blenheim area. He became a local councillor in Blenheim, Ontario between 1956 and 1958 and was then elected at the Kent riding in the 1958 federal election. Although he was defeated in the following federal election in 1962, he won the riding back in the 1963 election and was re-elected in 1965. In 1966, riding boundaries were changed and Danforth won at the new Kent—Essex riding in the 1968 federal election and again in the 1972 election. Danforth left federal politics when he was defeated in the 1974 election by Robert Daudlin of the Liberal party.

Archives 
There is a Harold Danforth fonds at Library and Archives Canada. Archival reference number is R5392.

References

External links
 

1916 births
1993 deaths
Members of the House of Commons of Canada from Ontario
Progressive Conservative Party of Canada MPs
People from Leamington, Ontario